Atyuryevsky District (Atereń ajmak; , Atüŕbuje) is an administrative and municipal district (raion), one of the twenty-two in the Republic of Mordovia, Russia. It is located in the west of the republic. Its administrative center is the rural locality (a selo) of Atyuryevo. As of the 2010 Census, the total population of the district was 10,952, with the population of Atyuryevo accounting for 40.4% of that number.

Administrative and municipal status
Within the framework of administrative divisions, Atyuryevsky District is one of the twenty-two in the republic. The district is divided into eleven selsoviets which comprise fifty rural localities. As a municipal division, the district is incorporated as Atyuryevsky Municipal District. Its eleven selsoviets are incorporated into eleven rural settlements within the municipal district. The selo of Atyuryevo serves as the administrative center of both the administrative and municipal district.

Notable residents 

Vladimir Kanaykin (born 1985), race walker
Olena Shumkina (borm 1988), Ukrainian race walker

References

Notes

Sources



 
Districts of Mordovia